Leland Honeyman Jr. (born February 23, 2005) is an American professional stock car racing driver who competes part-time in the NASCAR Xfinity Series, driving the No. 45 Chevrolet Camaro for Alpha Prime Racing. He previously competed full-time in the ARCA Menards Series East and part-time in the ARCA Menards Series and the NASCAR Truck Series for Young's Motorsports.

Racing career

Early career
Honeyman would first get his start racing quads at the age of two and would rise through the ranks to International Trophy Karts at the age of four. For three years, he would then make starts in Jr. Trucks and Off Road Jr. Trucks, winning three championships in the off-road series. On his eighth birthday, he would race his first go-kart race, winning three championships.

In 2017, he would win the Bandolero championship in INEX.

In 2021, he would finish runner up to Nick Loden for the championship in the Carolina Pro Late Model Series.

He also competed in the CARS Tour.

ARCA Menards Series East
On January 28, 2022, Honeyman was announced to race full-time for Young's Motorsports in the ARCA Menards Series East that year, driving the No. 02.

NASCAR Camping World Truck Series
Along with the January 28 announcement, he announced that he would attempt to make his first start in the NASCAR Camping World Truck Series in late 2022.

Motorsports career results

NASCAR
(key) (Bold – Pole position awarded by qualifying time. Italics – Pole position earned by points standings or practice time. * – Most laps led.)

Xfinity Series

Camping World Truck Series

ARCA Menards Series

ARCA Menards Series East

ARCA Menards Series West

References

External links
 
 

2005 births
Living people
ARCA Menards Series drivers
NASCAR drivers
CARS Tour drivers
Racing drivers from Arizona
Racing drivers from Phoenix, Arizona
Sportspeople from Phoenix, Arizona